Glyphicnemis is a small genus of parasitoid wasps in the family Ichneumonidae that occurs in the Holarctic and Indo-Malaysian region (source). There are 13 described species.

Species 
G. atrata (Strobl, 1901)
G. brevioides (Uchida, 1952)
G. californica (Cresson, 1879)
G. clypealis (Thomson, 1883)
G. mandibularis (Cresson, 1864)
G. nigrifemorum Luhman, 1986
G. osakensis (Uchida, 1930)
G. profligator (Fabricius, 1775)
G. satoi (Uchida, 1930)
G. townesi Ciochia, 1973
G. vagabunda (Gravenhorst, 1829)
G. vulgaris Luhman, 1986
G. watanabei (Uchida, 1930)

References

Parasitic wasps
Ichneumonidae
Ichneumonidae genera